Péplum is a novel in French by the Belgian author Amélie Nothomb. It was first published in 1996 by Éditions Albin Michel.

This futuristic novel is presented as an autobiography. A young writer named A.N. is brought to the hospital for a minor operation. Upon waking up she finds herself in an unknown room, very different from her hospital room. She then meets Celsius, a mysterious scientist, who explains that between her surgery and the time she woke up 585 years have passed and it is now 2580. A dialogue takes place between the young novelist and the scientist from the future, and they discuss numerous topics, such as the scarcity of energy resources, political systems, the classical authors, as well as philosophy and "the great war of the twenty-second century".

References 

1996 Belgian novels
Novels by Amélie Nothomb
Belgian science fiction novels
French-language novels
Éditions Albin Michel books